Michel André Kervaire (26 April 1927 – 19 November 2007) was a French mathematician who made significant contributions to topology and algebra.

He introduced the Kervaire semi-characteristic. He was the first to show the existence of topological n-manifolds with no differentiable structure (using the Kervaire invariant), and (with John Milnor) computed the number of exotic spheres in dimensions greater than four. He is also well known for fundamental contributions to high-dimensional knot theory. The solution of the Kervaire invariant problem was announced by Michael Hopkins in Edinburgh on 21 April 2009.

Education
He was the son of André Kervaire (a French industrialist) and Nelly Derancourt. After completing high school in France, Kervaire pursued his studies at ETH Zurich (1947–1952), receiving a Ph.D. in 1955. His thesis, entitled Courbure intégrale généralisée et homotopie, was written under the direction of Heinz Hopf and Beno Eckmann.

Career
Kervaire was a professor at New York University's Courant Institute from 1959 to 1971, and then at the University of Geneva from 1971 to 1997, when he retired.  He received an honorary doctorate from the University of Neuchâtel in 1986; he was also an honorary member of the Swiss Mathematical Society.

See also
 Homology sphere
 Kervaire manifold
 Plus construction

Selected publications
 
 This paper describes the structure of the group of smooth structures on an n-sphere for n > 4.

Notes

References

External links
 

Michel Kervaire's work in surgery and knot theory (Slides of lectures given by Andrew Ranicki at the Kervaire Memorial Symposium, Geneva, February 2009)

20th-century French  mathematicians
20th-century Swiss mathematicians
Topologists
Algebraists
Courant Institute of Mathematical Sciences faculty
ETH Zurich alumni
People from Częstochowa
1927 births
2007 deaths
Academic staff of the University of Geneva
Swiss expatriates in the United States